In mathematics, a loop group is a group of loops in a topological group G with multiplication defined pointwise.

Definition
In its most general form a loop group is a group of continuous mappings from a manifold  to a topological group .

More specifically, let , the circle in the complex plane, and let  denote the space of continuous maps , i.e.

equipped with the compact-open topology.
Pointwise multiplication of such loops gives  the structure of a topological group.

The inverse is given by

and the identity by

A loop group is any subgroup of the free loop group .

Examples

An important example of a loop group is the group 

It is defined to be the kernel of the evaluation map 
,

Note that we may embed  into  as the subgroup of constant loops. Consequently, we arrive at a split exact sequence 
.

The space  splits as a semi-direct product, 
.

From this point of view,  is an H-space with respect to concatenation of loops. On the face of it, this seems to provide  with two very different product maps. However, it can be shown that concatenation and pointwise multiplication are homotopic.

Loop groups were used to explain the phenomenon of Bäcklund transforms in soliton equations by Chuu-Lian Terng and Karen Uhlenbeck.

Notes

References

See also 
Loop space
Loop algebra
Quasigroup

Topological groups
Solitons